Lamjung Himal also known as Lamjing Kailas is a mountain located in Gandaki Province, Nepal at an elevation of . It was first climbed in 1974 by Derrick Chamberlain and Phillip Neame.

References 

Mountains of the Gandaki Province
Six-thousanders of the Himalayas